The Durham Police and Crime Commissioner is the elected official who sets out the way crime is tackled by Durham Constabulary in the English county of County Durham. The post was created in November 2012, following an election held on 15 November 2012, and replaced the Durham Police Authority.

The first holder of the post was Ron Hogg, who represented the Labour Party. He died on 17 December 2019. The position was then held by Steve White, in an acting capacity. White was appointed by the Labour-controlled Durham Police and Crime Panel on 20 September 2019, after Hogg fell ill. White is a former official of the Police Federation. He had been the chief executive officer of the Durham Police and Crime Commissioner’s office before his appointment:

At the 2021 local elections, Labour's Joy Allen was elected as the police and crime commissioner and her friend, Nigel Bryson, was appointed as her deputy. Durham has never before had a deputy police and crime commissioner. Bryson's appointment sparks claims of 'nepotism' and a member of the Police and Crime Panel suggested it was a 'job for the boys'.

List of Durham police and crime commissioners

References

Police and crime commissioners in England